The King Wah Centre, situated at the northeast corner of Shantung Street and Nathan Road, is a popular shopping centre in the Mong Kok area of Hong Kong. The 16-storey building features ten restaurant floors, three karaoke floors, along with 136 stores selling a variety of fashionable products.

History

King Wah Restaurant 
In 1955, ‘The king of dim sum restaurants’ Tan Jienan, who was from Foshan and once operated Taotaoju in Guangzhou, opened King Wah Restaurant.
It was a landmark of Mong Kok at the time and served different segments of society on each of its five floors:
 1/F was bakery with spittoon in the store that served grassroots
 2/F was a Western restaurant
 3/F was a Chinese tea housewith carpets;
 4/F was a Chinese wine housewith waiters serving customers with towels, and asked customers for tips;
 5/F was a nightclub that served the upper class.

An unwritten tradition was that on horse racing days, gamblers would eat homemade Sachima at 20 to 30% discount there. The commonly known name of Sachima is the pun of “horse” in Cantonese, thus gamblers believed that after they have eaten it, they would win at horse racing (“食完馬仔，贏馬仔” ). During each year's Mid-Autumn Festival a large advertisement for moon cake would be displayed outside the restaurant.

The restaurant closed in 1989.

King Wah Centre

The current building cost two hundred million Hong Kong dollars to build. It housed a Wing On department store in the 1990s. When that store closed the building was taken over by small independent shops selling popular clothing and accessories aimed primarily at teenage customers. The new shopping centre was colloquially referred to as "Red Spot" as the building's sign used to feature a distinctive red spot, now covered up by other signage.

A new tenant 

In June 2013, all 130 original tenants moved out of King Wah Centre, which was taken over by the Sincere Department Store, one of the oldest local department stores in Hong Kong. Other bidders for the property included the American clothing brand Forever 21. The rent will be in a monthly rate of HKD $6,000,000 and $200 per square feet with a rental period of 10 years. The Sincere shop in Grand Century Place is currently undergoing refurbishment and is expected to be much smaller in size after the renovation, and Sincere found that King Wah Centre would a perfect location for Sincere to expand their business further in the same district. Local citizens have criticized the loss of small businesses associated with this takeover.

Floors 

B/F is the basement where there are photo sticker machines for people to take photos.
G/F is the ground floor which is leased out to Chow Sang Sang.
UG - 3/F is the Sincere department store.
5 - 16/F feature Japanese, Korean and Western restaurants.

References

External links
 

Mong Kok
Shopping centres in Hong Kong